WJFW-TV (channel 12) is an television station licensed to Rhinelander, Wisconsin, United States, serving the Wausau area as an affiliate of NBC. Owned by Rockfleet Broadcasting, the station maintains studios on County Road G (along WIS 17) in Rhinelander, and its transmitter is located in Starks, Wisconsin.

Since WJFW's transmitter is located further north than the other north-central Wisconsin stations, it can only be seen in Wausau proper and not other areas in Marathon County to the south and west. Therefore, it operates a low-power digital fill-in translator in Wausau (W27AU-D). This broadcasts on channel 27 from a transmitter on Mosinee Hill southwest of the I-39/US 51/WIS 29 interchange.

History

The station signed on October 20, 1966, as WAEO-TV, named after its original owner, Congressman Alvin E. O'Konski. Airing an analog signal on VHF channel 12, its original studios were located next to the transmitter tower. This was at the time one of the tallest structures in the world. Before its launch, NBC was seen in the market through a secondary affiliation on CBS outlet WSAU-TV (now WSAW-TV), along with fringe coverage via Green Bay's WFRV-TV (then an NBC affiliate).

On November 17, 1968, a small plane with three passengers crashed into the transmitter tower knocking it out along with the station's building. It was off the air until a new tower was erected in the same location as the original. New studios were eventually built at the current location in Rhinelander. After the new transmitter's completion, WAEO returned to the air on September 1, 1969.

On June 1, 1979, the station was sold to the Chicago-based minority-owned company Seaway Communications. As a result, it was the first VHF commercial television station in the United States to be owned by minority interests. On April 15, 1985, Dr. Jasper F. Williams (founder and CEO of Seaway Communications) was killed in a plane crash. In his memory, the call letters were changed to WJFW-TV on October 5, 1986.

It would be the last commercial station in the market to sign on until the 1999 sign-on of Wittenberg-licensed Fox affiliate WFXS (whose programming assets were transferred to WSAU sister station WZAW-LD in 2015); as such, it continued to air animated children's programming from syndication weekday afternoons well into the early 1990s due to a lack of independent stations which would usually carry that type of content, outside of local cable availability of Green Bay and Milwaukee stations. This included the station serving as the market's outlet for The Disney Afternoon, a rarity for a Big Three network affiliate.

In 1989, it activated a low-powered translator on channel 27 in Wausau. The station's main transmitter is located further north than other North-Central Wisconsin stations. This was a result of WISN-TV in Milwaukee which also aired on channel 12 in the analog era. The other two VHF and one UHF stations in the market had aired their analog signals on channels which were also in use by Chicago stations but they were farther away and less prone to interference. As a result, WJFW only provided Grade B coverage of Wausau itself and some parts of Marathon County could not even see the station at all except on cable.

Seaway merged with Rockfleet Broadcasting, the station's current owner, in 1998. In mid-March 2009, the main signal added Universal Sports as a second digital subchannel. After the translator performed a "flash-cut" to digital, it began to offer Universal Sports on its second subchannel as well. WJFW's broadcasts have been digital-only since February 17, 2009. Its former analog channel allotment (12) is now the home to the digital signal of CW affiliate WMOW. On May 23, 2011, WJFW replaced Universal Sports in favor of Tribune Broadcasting's Antenna TV digital subchannel network.

Technical information

Subchannels
The station's digital signal is multiplexed:

On September 1, 2020, WJFW added Cozi TV programming on DT2, moving Antenna TV to a new third subchannel.

Translator

References

External links
WJFW-TV "NBC 12" 
WJFW-DT2 Antenna TV

Television channels and stations established in 1966
1966 establishments in Wisconsin
JFW-TV
NBC network affiliates
Cozi TV affiliates
Antenna TV affiliates
Rhinelander, Wisconsin